The Lady Angela Stakes is a thoroughbred horse race run annually during the third week of May at Woodbine Racetrack in Toronto, Canada. An Ontario Sire Stakes, it is a restricted race for three-year-old fillies contested over a distance of seven furlongs on Polytrack synthetic dirt.

Inaugurated in 1982 at Greenwood Raceway, it was raced at a distance of six and one half furlongs in its first year but in 1983 was modified to its present seven furlongs. The event was moved to the Woodbine track in 1984.

The race is named for the Canadian Horse Racing Hall of Fame mare, Lady Angela. The Irish-bred daughter of the very important British sire Hyperion, she was the dam of Nearctic.

Records
Speed  record: 
  1:22.97 – Blonde Executive (2004)

Most wins by an owner:
 2 – Eaton Hall Farm (1985, 2009)
 2 – Knob Hill Stable (1988, 1992)

Most wins by a jockey:
 4 – Mickey Walls (1992, 1996, 1999, 2000)

Most wins by a trainer:
 2 – Michael J. Doyle (1985, 2009)
 2 – Robert E. Barnett (2007, 2008)
 2 – Reade Baker (2005, 2011)

Winners

* † In 1986, Miss Tressette finished first but was disqualified and set back to second.

References

Citations

General references
 The 2009 Lady Angela Stakes at Woodbine Entertainment

Ungraded stakes races in Canada
Flat horse races for three-year-old fillies
Recurring sporting events established in 1982
Woodbine Racetrack
1982 establishments in Ontario